Calera may refer to:

Places
Calera, Alabama
Calera, Oklahoma
Calera, Chile
Calera de Tango, Chile
Calera de Víctor Rosales, Mexico
Calera de León, Spain
Calera y Chozas, Spain

Other uses
Calera Capital, a private equity firm 
Calera, a synonym of the moth genus Peoria (moth)

See also
La Calera (disambiguation)